On 14 June 2006, a by-election was held for the vacant seat of Joseph Deiss on the Federal Council, the government of Switzerland.

The joint chambers of the Federal Assembly elected Doris Leuthard of the Christian Democratic People's Party of Switzerland in the first round of voting with 133 votes out of 234.

Candidates 
Doris Leuthard, at that time president of her party and member of the National Council representing the canton of Aargau, was the only official candidate for the seat of Joseph Deiss. Several other members of her party also received votes.

Results

See also 
 List of members of the Swiss Federal Council

References
  Election website of the Swiss Federal Assembly

2006 elections in Switzerland
Swiss Federal Council elections